Leopoldville may refer to:
 Kinshasa, the capital of the Democratic Republic of the Congo, formerly known as Léopoldville until 1966
 SS Léopoldville, a number of ships by this name

See also
 Leopoldstadt, a District of Vienna, Austria
 Leopoldov, a town in Slovakia
 Leopold Quarter, a quarter of Brussels, Belgium
 Leopold Township, Perry County, Indiana, a township in Indiana, United States